East Germany had diplomatic relations with the United States from 1974 to 1990. The GDR's ambassadors to the U.S. were also accredited to Canada as the GDR did not have a physical diplomatic presence there.

Listed below are the head East German diplomatic agents to the United States, their diplomatic rank, and the effective start and end of their service in the United States.

List of East German ambassadors to the United States (1974–1990)

See also

 East Germany–United States relations
 Embassy of the United States, Berlin
 Embassy of Germany, Washington, D.C.
 Ambassadors of the United States to East Germany
 Germany–United States relations
 Ambassadors of Germany to the United States
 Ambassadors of the United States to Germany

References

 
East Germany
East Germany ambassadors
Canada–East Germany relations
Ambassadors